Country Fest is an annual music festival held in late June at the Amphitheater Venue in Cadott, Wisconsin. Established in 1987, it is the largest country music and camping event in the United States outside of Tennessee.

Overview
Country Fest is three days of music and entertainment on the grounds of a permanent festival site that is now one of the longest running summer festivals in the country.

Country Fest is held in a natural 380-acre amphitheater in central Wisconsin. The main stage, four side stages, and surrounding infrastructure are permanent structures with over 7,000 campsites surrounding the concert grounds. Major performances are scheduled for the main stage each day of the three-day event. Regional bands perform at various times on the side stages between the main stage and the Crossroads hilltop stage throughout the festival. VIP, Reserved, Reserved Lawn, or General Admission ticket packages are often available along with Camping & Pit Passes for all three days. Changes are often being made to improve the festival experience at Country Fest and are often posted on the website.

Acts that have performed at Country Fest, include Brad Paisley, Carrie Underwood, Keith Urban, Kenny Chesney, George Strait, Johnny Cash, Jason Aldean, Lady Antebellum, Little Big Town, and Miranda Lambert as well as Reba McEntire, Blake Shelton, Taylor Swift, Luke Bryan, Eric Church, Florida Georgia Line and Tim McGraw.

Country Fest 2021 was scheduled for June 24-26, 2021 featuring Thomas Rhett, Dierks Bentley, Kane Brown, among others. There was no festival in 2020.

See also
List of country music festivals
Country music

References

External links
Country Fest official website
Wisconsin Country Music Festivals

Folk festivals in the United States 
Music festivals established in 1987
Music festivals in Wisconsin
Country music festivals in the United States
Annual events in Wisconsin
Events in Wisconsin
Tourist attractions in Chippewa County, Wisconsin